Rogstad Glacier is a glacier flowing northwest along the north side of Isingen Mountain, in the Sverdrup Mountains, Queen Maud Land. Photographed from the air by the German Antarctic Expedition (1938–39). Mapped by Norwegian cartographers from surveys and air photos by Norwegian-British-Swedish Antarctic Expedition (NBSAE) (1949–52) and air photos by the Norwegian expedition (1958–59). Named for Egil Rogstad, chief radio operator with the NBSAE.

See also
 List of glaciers in the Antarctic
 Glaciology

References
 

Glaciers of Queen Maud Land
Princess Martha Coast